Taiwan's 400 Year History: The Origins and Continuing Development of the Taiwanese Society and People is a book about the people's history of Taiwan, written by Su Beng, one of the pioneers of Taiwan independence movement.

Su Beng wrote in the forewords to the Japanese edition that he chose to title the book after "Taiwanese people" as opposed to "Taiwan" itself because the oral history he received was too different from existing literature written from a "colonizer perspective". Su Beng felt many advocators of the Taiwan independence movement did not understand the history of Taiwan well, and spent three years writing, in Japanese, the original version of Modern History of Taiwanese in 400 Years in 1962. After another six years, he finished the Chinese version, and the English version was published in 1986. In 1999, he added an appendix for Chinese version. A revised Chinese edition was published in 2004.

A third of the book criticizes the ruling characteristics of Kuomintang. The book also analyzes the basic structure of Taiwan's economy (the productive forces and relations of production), to explain how different social classes in Taiwan were formed, and focuses on different eras of social and international position and trends.

The book was banned during the period of Martial law in Taiwan, but underground circulation exposed many readers, including Lee Teng-hui, to a more indigenous view of Taiwan.

Versions

References

1962 non-fiction books
History books about Japan
History books about Taiwan
20th-century history books